Jared Sean Gallagher (born 18 January 2002) is a Singaporean professional footballer who plays as a midfielder for Singapore Premier League club Young Lions.

Early life
His family migrated to Hong Kong when he was in Primary 2 and stayed there for 8 years before playing for Kithcee U18 in Hong Kong.

Career statistics

Club

Notes

International statistics

U23 International caps

References

2002 births
Living people
Singaporean footballers
Association football defenders
Singapore Premier League players
Young Lions FC players